Anne Fontaine (born Anne-Fontaine Sibertin-Blanc; 15 July 1959) is a Luxembourger film director, screenwriter, and former actress. She lives and works in France.

Life and career
Born Anne-Fontaine Sibertin-Blanc in Luxembourg, sister of actor Jean-Chrétien Sibertin-Blanc, she went as a young child to live in Lisbon, where her father, Antoine Sibertin-Blanc, is a music professor and cathedral organist. In adolescence she moved to Paris and trained in dance with Joseph Russillo while continuing her academic education, including philosophy. Her husband is Philippe Carcassonne, the film producer, and they have an adopted son, Tienne, who was born in Cambodia.

While still dancing, she was picked by Robert Hossein to play Esmeralda in a 1980 theatrical production of The Hunchback of Notre Dame and around this time started to use the name Anne Fontaine. She continued with acting and became known for her roles in comedies like Si ma gueule vous plaît... (1981) and P.R.O.F.S.(1985). An opportunity to be assistant director came with a 1986 stage version of Louis-Ferdinand Céline's Journey to the End of the Night at the Renaud-Barrault theatre.

Fontaine's first project as solo director, Les Histoires d'amour finissent mal... en général (Love Affairs Usually End Badly), won the 1993 Prix Jean Vigo. In 1995, she worked with her brother on the comedy Augustin. Two years later, she wrote and directed the successful Dry Cleaning (Nettoyage à Sec). It won the Best Screenplay award at the 1997 Venice Film Festival and is generally considered a milestone on Fontaine's way to becoming "an important figure in contemporary French cinema".

In 1999 the character Augustin (Jean-Chrétien Sibertin-Blanc) re-appeared in Fontaine's film Augustin, King of Kung-Fu. How I Killed My Father was released in 2001, and Nathalie... followed in 2003. The 2005 film, Entre ses mains was widely described as a thriller: an "intimate thriller" according to Fontaine herself. A third Augustin film, Nouvelle chance (also known as Oh La La) was released in 2006. Then came The Girl From Monaco in 2008 and Coco Before Chanel, her biopic of Coco Chanel, in 2009.

Fontaine's work is not easily categorised, though the phrase "psychological drama" is often used. She told a UK newspaper, "I try to work on my characters' blind side, in a kind of Freudian way: to ask, 'What are the things about themselves that they're unaware of?' I'm fascinated by the irony of fate, when something goes into a skid. All my stories have an element of cruelty in them."

While knowing that the movement of "women's cinema" worked as a counter to the classical Hollywood system, Fontaine didn't like to identify with this. During an interview in 1998 with Eve-Laure Moros, she stated: "If people say that 'Nettoyage a sec' is a woman's film, I'm very surprised, I don't know what that means... I think that to be a filmmaker, as far as sexuality, it's something that's really de-sexualizing. That is, you become a bizarre thing, when you're directing a film---during the shooting, you're neither a man nor a woman, you're really something strange and very ambivalent."

Filmography

As filmmaker

As actress

See also
 List of female film and television directors
 List of LGBT-related films directed by women

References

External links

 

1959 births
Living people
French women film directors
20th-century French actresses
French women screenwriters
French film actresses
French television actresses
People from Luxembourg City
Luxembourgian screenwriters
Luxembourgian women screenwriters
20th-century French screenwriters
20th-century French women writers
20th-century Luxembourgian writers
20th-century Luxembourgian women writers
21st-century French screenwriters
21st-century French women writers
21st-century Luxembourgian writers
21st-century Luxembourgian women writers